"Benjaman Kyle" was the alias chosen by an American man who had severe amnesia. On August 31, 2004, he was found, naked and injured, without any possessions or identification, next to a dumpster behind a Burger King restaurant in Richmond Hill, Georgia. Between 2004 and 2015, neither he nor the authorities had determined his identity or background, despite searches that had included television publicity and various other methods.

In late 2015, genetic detective work, which had gone on for years, led to the discovery of his identity as William Burgess Powell, born August 29, 1948.  A gap of more than 20 years in his life history still remains without any documented records. With the rediscovery of his Social Security number, he has again become eligible for employment and has received public assistance.

Incident and post-amnesia
On August 31, 2004, at 5:00a.m., a Burger King employee in Richmond Hill, Georgia, found Kyle unconscious, naked, and sunburned behind a dumpster of the restaurant. He had three depressions in his skull that appeared to have been caused by blunt force trauma and he also had red ant bites on his body. After discovering him, employees called the emergency services, and EMS took him to St. Joseph's/Candler Hospital in Savannah. He had no identity document and was recorded in hospital records as "Burger King Doe". After the incident, no criminal investigation was opened by Richmond Hill police until a friend inquired with the department in 2007. There were no reports of stolen vehicles in the area and local restaurants and hotels did not encounter any individuals matching Kyle's description.  Two weeks later he was transferred to Memorial Health University Medical Center, where records state he was semiconscious.

He eventually said that he remembered his name was Benjaman, spelled with two 'a's, but said he could not recall his last name. He came up with the surname "Kyle" from his police and hospital placeholder name. He had cataracts in both eyes, and had corrective surgery nine months after he was found, when a charity raised enough money to pay for the operation. Upon seeing himself in the mirror for the first time, Kyle realized he was around 20 years older than he thought he was.

Kyle believed he was passing through Richmond Hill, either on U.S. Route 17 or Interstate 95 in late August 2004. He may also have been on the road because of Hurricane Charley, which had hit earlier that month.

After being released from the hospital, Kyle spent several years between the Grace House men's shelter and hospitals. In 2007 while at The J.C. Lewis Health Care Center he met a nurse who first inquired about his past. The nurse helped support Kyle financially while he earned about $100 a month mostly doing yard work. While driving his truck in a yard, Kyle discovered that he still remembered how to drive a car. He was diagnosed with dissociative amnesia in 2007 by Jason A. King in Atlanta. King suggested that Kyle's amnesia dates from August 31, 2004. Georgia Legal Services did not obtain medical records for Kyle because Memorial Health requested an $800 fee. A friend contacted Georgia Congressman Jack Kingston for help with the case. To help with Kyle's identification, Kingston's office sent DNA samples to the FBI's National Criminal Justice Information Services Division in West Virginia.

In March 2011, Kyle was approached by Florida State University's College of Motion Picture Arts graduate student John Wikstrom. Kyle moved to Jacksonville, Florida, traveling on foot, in order to be filmed for a documentary. In 2011, with help from Florida State Representative Mike Weinstein, Kyle was able to obtain a legal, government-issued Florida Legacy ID. Kyle's story appeared in a report on News4Jax, which caught the attention of a local business owner who subsequently employed Kyle as a dishwasher.  he lived in Jacksonville Beach, Florida, in a 5-by-8-foot, air-conditioned shack provided by a benefactor.

For many years after his amnesia Kyle was homeless and had been unable to obtain employment as he was unable to remember his full Social Security number. Several online petitions were created asking lawmakers to grant Kyle a new Social Security number. In 2012, an online petition was created on the We the People petitioning system on whitehouse.gov,
but when its deadline expired on December 25, it had received only two-thirds of the number of signatures required to receive an official response. In February 2015, forensic genealogist Colleen Fitzpatrick reported that Kyle had cut off all contact with her just as she felt she was nearing a breakthrough. A DNA test revealed that Kyle shared significant amount of DNA with members of a family named Powell in the western Carolinas descendants of a 19th-century man named Abraham Lovely Powell.

On September 16, 2015, Kyle announced that his real identity had been found, including identifying his name and close family members.

Search for identity
There were a number of major efforts to identify Kyle by matching his fingerprints or DNA with that stored in various databases. These efforts included:
 Fingerprint comparison to the FBI's National Crime Information Center (NCIC) database of offenders
 Fingerprint comparison to databases of military personnel and government workers
 A Y-DNA test through the Center for Human Identification at the University of North Texas Health Science Center, Fort Worth, Texas
 A Y-DNA test for genetic genealogy through Family Tree DNA in Houston, Texas
 Searches on Y-DNA online databases such as Ybase.org, Ysearch.org, usystrdatabase.org, smgf.org, and DNAAncestry.com
 Searches on mtDNA online databases such as mitosearch.org, EMPOP.org, and smgf.org
 Facial recognition comparison by the Indiana Bureau of Motor Vehicles with individuals who have obtained an Indiana driver's license since 1998
 Research of the birth announcements published in Indianapolis newspapers around the time of Kyle's remembered birthdate
 Postings with missing persons networks

In July 2009, a search was being made by the United States Department of Veterans Affairs (VA) for Kyle's Vietnam draft registration, based on his birthdate and his physical characteristics. 

Newspaper articles were published in the Boulder Daily Camera on July 5, 2009, and in the Denver Post on July 7, 2009. Based on Kyle's memories of the University of Colorado Boulder campus, it was hoped at the time that someone would respond to the articles to identify him.

Kyle took several DNA tests that offer clues to his origins. A genetic genealogy DNA test by Family Tree DNA produced a distant match with members of the Powell DNA Study. Based on these results, in March 2010 an almost perfect DNA match was discovered in the Sorenson Molecular Genealogy Foundation database with a Davidson of Scottish ancestry, a grandson of Robert Holden Davidson (b. 1885, Logan, Utah, d. 1946, Chico, California). This Davidson's results were very different from other Davidsons who have been tested by the Davidson/Davison/Davisson Research DNA Study Project. The fact that Kyle had several weak matches to Powells, with a single strong match to a Davidson, indicates a possible non-paternity event in the male line of his family—that is, an adoption, a name change, or an illegitimacy. It was surmised that his legal name might be Davidson, but that in past generations, the family name was originally Powell. A comparison of the whereabouts of the Powell and Davidson families revealed that members of both families were living in proximity in the Pacific Northwest in the early 1900s.

A geographical comparison between Kyle's Y-DNA results and the YHRD Y Users Group database showed a somewhat close match in southern Kansas and northern Oklahoma, but the U.S. coverage in this database is sparse and includes only Y-DNA haplotypes. A more comprehensive autosomal DNA test by 23andMe relating to mixed-gender family lines reveals a large number of matches with ancestry in the western Carolinas, eastern Tennessee, northern Alabama, and northern Georgia.

Colleen Fitzpatrick attempted to create a family tree for Kyle, and based on DNA tests, cousins were identified from the western Carolinas who collaborated with her to try to determine his identity. Fitzpatrick's efforts had not yet pinpointed his exact identity when he cut off communication with her.

Kyle's appearance on a Reddit AMA in 2012 and again in 2013 attracted several possible leads, most of which were disproven.

Recorded memories
Kyle remembered that he was born 10 years before Michael Jackson and on the same day, giving him a possible birth date of August 29, 1948. Genetic testing suggested that he may have had the surname Powell or Davidson or have relatives with these names. Through hypnosis, he recalled a partial Social Security number 3X5-44-XXXX, consistent with numbers assigned in Wisconsin, Michigan, Illinois, and Indiana during the 1960s. Hypnosis suggested that Kyle had two or three brothers, whose names or faces he did not remember, but otherwise he could not recall any other people from his life. Kyle had memories of Indianapolis as a child, including the Soldiers' and Sailors' Monument, the Woolworth's on the Circle, and the Indiana Theater showing movies in Cinerama. He remembered Crown Hill Cemetery, although not its name, the Scottish Rite Cathedral, and the White River when "it was mostly just a dumping ground". He also remembered grilled cheese sandwiches for a quarter and glasses of milk for a nickel at the Indiana State Fair. Based on his reactions to the mention of nuns during hypnosis, he may have been raised Catholic and may have attended Catholic schools. Searching through Indianapolis area high school yearbook records came up empty, although records from that era are often incomplete.

More specific memories placed him in Indianapolis between at least 1954 and 1963. The earlier date is based on his recognition of the Fountain Square Theater, but not the Granada Theater in the Fountain Square area of town. The Granada closed in the mid-1950s. The later date is based on his recollections of a 2% retail sales tax that was enacted by the State of Indiana in 1963, and that the popular WLS Chicago radio station disc jockey Dick Biondi left the station that year over management issues.

Kyle also had memories of being in the Denver Metropolitan Area. He had detailed memories of the subscription the University of Colorado Boulder's Norlin Library had to Restaurants & Institutions. He also remembered the Round the Corner Restaurant on The Hill, and the Flatirons and The Fox Theater near the Boulder campus. This placed Kyle in Colorado in the late 1970s to early 1980s. Kyle reported having memories of the controversy surrounding the construction of mass transit in Denver, at a time when the city still had no financing to proceed. Although the RTD Bus & Light Rail system in Denver went into operation in 1994, public debate over the construction of the system dates back to about 1980, consistent with the time period of the other memories that Kyle has of Denver and Boulder.

More specific memories of Boulder placed Kyle there between 1976 and 1983. The earlier date was based on his memory that he arrived during the construction of the Pearl Street Mall in the downtown area, and shortly after the Big Thompson Canyon flood that occurred on July 31 – August 1, 1976. The later date was based on the year that the King Soopers grocery store chain merged with Kroger.

Kyle had detailed knowledge of restaurant management and food preparation equipment, leading to the belief that he may have once worked in these industries.

Kyle had nearly no memory of his life after the 1980s, including how he ended up in Georgia. One event he does remember is reading about the September 11 attacks. When asked by doctors to recall the Presidents of the United States, he was able to recall only those from the 20th century. Many of his memories he cannot describe in words and are at the tip of his tongue.

Identification
On September 16, 2015, Kyle announced on his Facebook page that his identity had been established by a team of adoption researchers led by CeCe Moore.

"A little over two months ago I was informed by CeCe Moore that that they had established my Identity using DNA. Many people have shared their DNA profiles so that they may be compared with mine. Through a process of elimination they determined my ancestral bloodline and who my relatives were. A DNA test taken by a close relative has confirmed that we are related," Kyle wrote.

The Orlando Sentinel reported on September 22 that Kyle had received a Florida identification card with the help of IDignity, an Orlando-based organization that helps the homeless and others obtain identification documents. IDignity also assisted in establishing Kyle's identification.  

On November 21, 2016, Kyle's true identity was revealed to be William Burgess Powell. He was born on August 29, 1948, in Lafayette, Indiana, and was raised there. In 1976, he had cut ties with his family and abandoned his possessions, including his car and the trailer where he had been living. His family filed a missing persons report at the time, and police found he had moved to Boulder, Colorado, where he had moved on a whim with a coworker. His birth date turned out to be one of the details about his previous life he had been able to remember correctly. A reporter was able to find some Social Security records of him working in various jobs until 1983, after which no records could be found for the remaining period of more than 20 years before his discovery in 2004.

Media coverage
Kyle appeared on the Dr. Phil show on the October 16, 2008, episode "Who am I". Dr. Phil McGraw paid for Kyle to seek a professional hypnotist in an effort to help him recover lost memories. He also appeared on local television networks across the country. Kyle says he has been met with skepticism about the case.

In March 2011, Kyle was the subject of a student documentary from Florida State University's College of Motion Picture Arts by filmmaker John Wikstrom. The film, entitled Finding Benjaman, was in part a description about his curious circumstances, and in part an appeal to action for local media groups and politicians. The film was invited to be shown at the Tribeca Film Festival and at the American Pavilion at the Cannes Film Festival. Through the outreach involved with the film, Kent Justice of News4Jax (WJXT) ran a series on Kyle with the help of Florida Senator Mike Weinstein. Through Weinstein, and the Florida Department of Highway Safety and Motor Vehicles, Kyle was able to obtain a Legacy Identification Card to supplement the identity card he received when he was in Georgia. No new leads were developed by the story, but he was able to find work and housing through the generosity of viewers.

The news of Kyle's identification received widespread coverage, including stories by the Orlando Sentinel, ABC News and New York's Daily News.

See also
List of solved missing person cases

References

External links
 
 "The Last Unknown Man" | New Republic | 2016-11-21

1948 births
2000s missing person cases
Formerly missing people
Living people
Missing person cases in Georgia (U.S. state)
People from Indianapolis
People from Lafayette, Indiana
People from Jacksonville Beach, Florida
People with amnesia
People with dissociative disorder